Nouan-le-Fuzelier is a railway station in Nouan-le-Fuzelier, Centre-Val de Loire, France. The station opened on 20 July 1847 and is located on the Orléans–Montauban railway line. The station is served by regional services (TER Centre-Val de Loire) to Vierzon and Orléans.

Gallery

References

TER Centre-Val de Loire
Railway stations in Loir-et-Cher
Railway stations in France opened in 1847